Lori Shapiro  (née Ferrara) is an American clinical social worker and the First Lady of Pennsylvania. Her husband is Governor Josh Shapiro. Shapiro previously worked in the White House during the Clinton administration as an analyst in the Office of Science and Technology Policy and the liaison to the President’s Information Technology Advisory Committee.

Early life and education
Shapiro spent her early childhood in Yardley, Pennsylvania and later lived in Newtown, Pennsylvania. Her father was an electrical engineer, her mother was an office manager and her stepfather was a veterinarian.

Shapiro attended Akiba Hebrew Academy, now known as Jack M. Barrack Hebrew Academy, then located in Merion Station, Pennsylvania for high school. She played on the softball team. Her teacher, Sharon Levin, described her as a good student, who was "kind, caring for humankind, caring about the environment, and caring about social justice." Shapiro graduated from Colgate University with a Bachelors of Arts in anthropology.

Career

Clinton administration
During the Clinton administration, Shapiro worked in the White House as an analyst in the Office of Science and Technology Policy. She worked on issues relating to bridging the digital divide and technology and poverty. She was later promoted to serve as the liaison to the President’s Information Technology Advisory Committee.

Shapiro wanted to pursue a career in government, but opted to become a full-time mother to allow her husband, Josh, to pursue his political career.

First Lady of Pennsylvania
Shapiro did not take a major role in her husband's 2022 gubernatorial campaign. She stated that she opted to take a limited role because it is "important to us that our kids have stability at home, too." However, she did campaign with her husband, at times, during the final weeks of the campaign. Shapiro stated that one of her major roles during the campaign was "always [trying] to keep Josh motivated and be encouraging to him by reminding him how high the stakes are and why he is doing public service to begin with..."

In October 2022, Shapiro stated that she had not spent much time planning what her role of First Lady would look like. However, she described it as "an incredible honor and privilege...I would be proud to serve our commonwealth alongside Josh."

Personal life
She began dating Josh Shapiro in high school. They both attended Akiba Hebrew Academy, now Jack M. Barrack Hebrew Academy and met in ninth grade. 

While Shapiro was working at the White House, she reconnected with Josh Shapiro, who was working on Capitol Hill. They eventually resumed their relationship. They got engaged in 1997 in Jerusalem and married in May of that year. After giving birth to her daughter, the two moved back to Pennsylvania in 2001.

Shapiro is an avid fan of the Philadelphia 76ers and is involved with Barrack Hebrew Academy's alumni association.

References

Living people
People from Yardley, Pennsylvania

American social workers
Clinton administration personnel
Josh Shapiro
Jack M. Barrack Hebrew Academy alumni
Colgate University alumni
20th-century American women
21st-century American women
Place of birth missing (living people)
Date of birth missing (living people)
Year of birth missing (living people)
21st-century American Jews